The Wanderer  is a  science fiction novel by American writer Fritz Leiber, published as a paperback original by Ballantine Books in 1964. It won the 1965 Hugo Award for Best Novel.

Following its initial paperback edition, The Wanderer was reissued in hardcover by Walker & Co. in 1969, by Gregg Press in 1980, and by the Easton Press in 1991, as well as a Science Fiction Book Club edition in 1987. It was released in hardcover in the UK by Dennis Dobson in 1967, with a paperback edition following from Penguin Books in 1969. Translations have appeared in Dutch, French, German, Hungarian and Italian.

The Wanderer was the first novel to win the Hugo Award without previously being published in hardcover or appearing in some form in a genre magazine.

The novel deals with a wandering planet that enters the Solar System. Its narrative follows multiple disconnected groups of characters to portray the widespread impact of the Wanderer on the entire population of the Earth (and above it) as well as the varied reactions of different groups as they struggle to cope and survive.

Plot
The novel is set in a future a few decades after the mid-1960s, when it was written.  The Space Race is still on-going, and while both the USA and the USSR have lunar bases, by Soviets have gained the lead by sending an expedition to Mars.

From the point of view of most of the population of the Earth, a new planet appears out of nowhere close to the Moon shortly after a total lunar eclipse.  Within a few days the planet –referred to by everyone simply "The Wanderer"– apparently consumes the Moon. Its gravity causes mass death and destruction as it raises huge ocean waves and causes earthquakes and volcanic eruptions.  Flying saucers appear, apparently trying to mitigate some of the disastrous effects. Then, after a spectacular battle in space between the new planet and yet another which had appeared just as suddenly, the skies are empty again. Earth is left without its Moon.

The novel follows the lives of disparate people around the globe.  There is a man attempting a solo crossing of the Atlantic Ocean, a smuggler operating off the coast of Vietnam, two friends in England, a trio of drug addicts in New York City, and the military controllers of the USA Moon mission, deep in a bunker somewhere near Washington, D.C.

The main protagonists are three longtime friends.  Paul Hagbolt is escorting Margo Gelhorn (and her cat, Miaow) to observe the lunar eclipse at an observatory in California.  Their friend, and Margo's fiance, is Don Merriam, one of the American astronauts at the Moon base.  Following on a whim a sign advertising a "flying saucer symposium", Paul and Margo fall in with a group of intellectuals, dreamers, charlatans and misfits.  At that point events overtake them.  The new planet appears and triggers an earthquake that buries their cars in a landslide.  They must avoid tsunamis, more earthquakes, roving mobs and flying saucers to survive.  On the Moon Don Merriam is the only astronaut to escape the destruction of the American moonbase.  He tries to take off in one of the base's spaceships, only to fall through the Moon itself as it splits asunder under the influence of the new planet.  His ship is eventually captured by its crew.

Events take a bizarre turn when the group of saucer enthusiasts is faced with a tsunami.  A flying saucer appears, and a cat-like being uses some kind of gun to repel the waves.  Then the being uses the same device to pull Paul, who is holding Miaow, into the saucer.  At the same time the gun falls into the hands of the people on the ground.

In the saucer Paul meets a being calling itself Tigerishka.  A large, female telepathic feline creature, she initially mistakes Miaow as the intelligent being whose thoughts she can hear, and Paul as a "monkey".  Realizing her mistake, she regards Paul with contempt.  Monkey-beings are not well regarded by her people.  However she slowly warms to him, and explains why her planet had consumed the Moon.

Like many of the human characters, her people are intellectuals, dreamers, charlatans and misfits.  They belong to a culture that spans the Universe, has achieved immortality, and can construct planets and traverse hyperspace.  They can even create bodies for themselves that reflect the origins of their races, such as Tigerishka's cat-form.  They are, however, fleeing their culture's police.  The standard culture rejects nonconformists, and devotes itself to ensuring that intelligent life survives to the end of time, whereas  Tigerishka's cohort wants to explore hyperspace and tinker with space, time and the Mind.  Their flight has brought them to Earth orbit to refuel as huge amounts of matter must be converted to energy to power their hyperspace drive and their weapons: the Wanderer is running on empty.

As alien as Tigerishka is, Paul becomes besotted with her.  Tigerishka eventually yields to his advances.  At the same time, Don Merriam has been rescued with his ship by the Wanderer's other spaceships.  He is reunited with Paul aboard Tigerishka's ship.  Now they must testify in the Wanderer's trial, for the police have arrived.  A second planet, "The Stranger", colored a dull gray where the Wanderer is bright purple and yellow, appears and threatens battle.  Don and Paul give their testimony as to the good treatment they have seen, along with thousands of other humans appearing by some kind of holographic projection.  However the trial goes badly.  Paul and Don are evacuated in Don's ship, placed into position close to Earth by Tigerishka.  Tigerishka takes Miaow with her back to her planet.  Then the final battle takes place, and both planets disappear.  In the final scene, Margo and her companions walk to Vandenberg Spaceport as Don's ship comes in to land.

Characters

The three friends
Margo Gelhorn, Paul Hagbolt and Donald Merriam have been friends since High School.  Don became an astronaut, and Paul followed him into NASA by using his journalism qualifications to become a publicist for the agency.  Margo eventually bestowed her affections on Don and became his fiancee.  This left Paul with unrequited feelings for her, although Margo tells Paul that his feelings for Don are "more than brotherly".  The three form an odd triangle.  Margo herself is manipulative and exploits both Paul and Don to serve her ends.  Don is a loner at heart, however.  The triangle is set to fly apart.  Their collision with the Saucer Symposium provides the trigger.

The Saucer Symposium
When Paul and Margo encounter the Saucer Symposium on the beach near Vandenberg, they give the participants nicknames.
 "Doc" (Rudolf Brecht) is a relentless debunker of UFO myths and a top-notch piano salesman.  He is one of the symposium organizers and chairmen.
 "Turban" (Rama Joan) is a mystic who wears a turban and a man's tuxedo.  She was once the wife of a New York stockbroker but abandoned the comfortable lifestyle to lecture on mysticism and participate in events like the Symposium as a search for enlightenment.
 "Beardy" (Prof. Ross Hunter) is a sociologist from Oregon State University.  He originally began studying UFO groups but became interested in the subject itself.  During the adventures caused by the appearance of the Wanderer, he gets close to Margo and eventually seduces her, in the process exposing and neutralizing her manipulative instincts.
 "The Little Man" (Clarence Dowd) is a meticulous documenter of UFO events.  He draws the Wanderer as it shows its different faces to Earth.  These drawings appear in the book.
 "The Ramrod" (Charlie Furby) is a tough-looking man who is really a fantasist.  He insists that he has been transported to planets such as Ispan, whose location only he knows, but later admits he did this entirely in his fantasies.  He is accompanied by two women who may both be his wives, part of a polygamous sect.

New Yorkers
 Sally Harris and Jake Lesher are looking for a good time and thinking about writing a play.  They start with an amorous encounter on a Coney Island roller coaster, achieving orgasm the instant the Wanderer appears.  They wander through the crowds in Times Square, then take refuge in a penthouse apartment as the flood begins.  They barely survive as the tsunami caused by Wanderer and the Stranger almost reaches roof.
 Arab Jones, Pepe Martinez and High Bundy are stoners.  High on marijuana, they chase the sight of the Wanderer through the streets of New York, making up crazy stories about it.  They are eventually drowned by in-rushing flood in a subway station.

Floridians
 Barbara Katz is another adventurous young woman with an agenda.  She catches an old millionaire, Knolls K. Kettering III, spying on her with his telescope while she sunbathes.  Deciding to become his "friend" she dons a black "playsuit" and sneaks into his yard during the eclipse, finding him observing the event with the same telescope.  With "KKK" and his black servants, she tries to escape the flood tides by driving to high ground in the limousine.  Dodging racist policemen and a delegation of Ku Klux Klan vigilantes they ride out one flood by climbing trees, then find a washed-up yacht in which they survive the subsequent catastrophes.

An undisclosed location
 General "Spike" Stevens and Colonel Mabel Wallingford are two members of Mission Control team for the Moonbase, stationed deep underground somewhere near Washington D.C.  At first they think the events are a "problem", a simulation created by their superiors to test their readiness.  Not long after they realize that the events on their screens are real, the facility floods with water.  Stevens and Wallingford are left trapped together.  Fully aware they are about to die, they find their final release in each other, despite having hated each other from the moment they met.

In Great Britain
 Dai Davies and Richard Hillary enjoy a drink together in the English county of Somerset and then go their separate ways.  Hillary returns to the Home Counties of England but is caught in the exodus from the lowlands as tides flood the Thames basin.  He survives by reaching high ground in the Malvern Hills.  Davies, a romantic poet, composes odes to the new planet and then attempts to walk to Wales across the apparently dry estuary of the river Severn.  He is finally engulfed in a huge version of the Severn bore and drowns.

At sea
Wolf Loner is attempting a solo crossing of the Atlantic.  Because of bad weather, and the loss of radio communication, he has no idea that anything is happening in the sky.  His first inkling that anything strange has happened is when his boat bumps up against the bell tower of Old North Church in Boston.
 Bagong Bung is a smuggler supplying both sides in a guerrilla war, operating off the coast of Vietnam.  The suddenly large tides uncover a wreck on the sea floor, which he loots for treasure.
 Off the coast of South America, the atomic powered cruise liner Prince Charles is hijacked by revolutionaries.  Flood tides carry it deep into the Amazon basin where it eventually comes to rest on land, like Noah's Ark, with hundreds of passengers.

Reception
P. Schuyler Miller described the book as a "thoroughly uncharacteristic" Leiber novel, saying that "the feel of what is happening . . . counts for more than the plot" and predicting that The Wanderer "would eventually be awarded 'classic' status". Avram Davidson compared the novel unfavorably to Leiber's Conjure Wife, saying "The canvas is wide, the characters many, the charge scatters like buckshot, if you can imagine a buckshot cannon".

James Nicoll has described the novel as "terrible", saying that although its premise — "hollow planets filled with catgirls who want to steal the moon"  — may be "amazing or at least intriguing", the novel itself "falls well short of its potential"; he attributes its Hugo win to a weak slate of nominees, and to Leiber's "blatant and unabashed sucking up to SF fandom".

Availability
The Wanderer is available in paperback under  (Gollancz, 2000) as part of the SF Masterworks series.

References

External links 
 The Wanderer at the Library of Congress

Hugo Award for Best Novel-winning works
1964 American novels
1964 science fiction novels
American post-apocalyptic novels
American science fiction novels
Ballantine Books books
Novels by Fritz Leiber
Popular culture about the United States Space Force
Works about the United States Space Force